Andre Owens (born October 31, 1980) is an American former professional basketball player and head coach.

High school and college basketball
A 6'4" (1.93 m) guard, he played competitively at Perry Meridian High School where he was an Indiana All-Star in his senior season. Owens attended Indiana University and then transferred to the University of Houston.

Professional career
Undrafted, he signed with the Utah Jazz as a free agent prior to the start of the 2005-06 NBA season.  He was traded to the Golden State Warriors along with Devin Brown and Keith McLeod in exchange for Derek Fisher on July 12, 2006.  In October 2006, he was released by the Warriors without playing in any preseason games.

The Indiana Pacers signed Owens to a one-year deal on July 4, 2007.

In September 2008 he moved to Europe, signing a one-year contract with Serbian Adriatic League team  Crvena zvezda. In 2009, he signed with Türk Telekom B.K. in Ankara. In 2009, he signed with Lokomotiv Kuban in Krasnodar (Russian Basketball Super League). In October 2010 he signed a one-month contract with Bàsquet Manresa, and after his contract expired in November he signed with CB Granada until the end of the 2010–11 season, but left the team in March 2011. He then signed with the Ukrainian club BC Donetsk.

In December 2014, he signed with C.R.D. Libolo of Angola. On February 27, 2015, he signed with Zepter Vienna of the Österreichische Basketball Bundesliga.

In the summer of 2017, he played in the BIG3 League for 3's Company.  He was named the GM of the Indy Express.

NBA career statistics

Regular season 

|-
| align="left" | 2005–06
| align="left" | Utah
| 23 || 2 || 9.1 || .365 || .188 || .667 || .9 || .3 || .2 || .0 || 3.0
|-
| align="left" | 2007–08
| align="left" | Indiana
| 31 || 7 || 12.6 || .374 || .450 || .735 || 1.5 || 1.5 || .4 || .1 || 4.0
|- class="sortbottom"
| style="text-align:center;" colspan="2"| Career
| 54 || 9 || 11.1 || .370 || .375 || .712 || 1.3 || 1.0 || .3 || .0 || 3.6

Notes

External links
NBA.com Player Profile
ACB.com Player Profile
JAZZ: Get to Know Andre Owens @ NBA.com

1980 births
Living people
ABA League players
African-American basketball players
American expatriate basketball people in Angola
American expatriate basketball people in Austria
American expatriate basketball people in Bulgaria
American expatriate basketball people in Cyprus
American expatriate basketball people in Russia
American expatriate basketball people in Serbia
American expatriate basketball people in Spain
American expatriate basketball people in Turkey
American expatriate basketball people in Ukraine
American men's basketball players
Basketball players from Indianapolis
Bàsquet Manresa players
BC Donetsk players
BC Zepter Vienna players
Big3 players
C.R.D. Libolo basketball players
CB Granada players
Houston Cougars men's basketball players
Indiana Hoosiers men's basketball players
Indiana Pacers players
Keravnos B.C. players
KK Crvena zvezda players
Liga ACB players
PBC Lokomotiv-Kuban players
PBC Academic players
Point guards
Shooting guards
Türk Telekom B.K. players
Undrafted National Basketball Association players
Utah Jazz players
21st-century African-American sportspeople
20th-century African-American people
American men's 3x3 basketball players